Mandanak (also Romanized as Mandānak) is a village in Abali Rural District, Rudehen District, Damavand County, Tehran Province, Iran. At the 2006 census, its population was 53, in 16 families.

References 

Populated places in Damavand County